The arrow wriggler (Tyson belos), also known as Tyson's wriggler, is a species of fish in the monotypic genus Tyson of the Xenisthmidae (wriggler) family, which is regarded as a synonymous with the Eleotridae, Tyson's wriggler was discovered in 1983. It moves by wriggling, like other wrigglers. The genus is named for American ichthyologist Tyson R. Roberts; the specific epithet belos is Greek for "arrow". The arrow wriggler has been recorded from scattered localities in the West Pacific Ocean including Flores in Indonesia, the Trobriand Islands, the Great Barrier Reef, the Solomon Islands, Vanuatu and Fiji.

References

Xenisthmidae
Eleotridae
Fish described in 1983
Taxa named by Victor G. Springer